Fastest Finger First may refer to:

 Fastest Finger First, the preliminary round in the quiz show Who Wants to Be a Millionaire?
 Fastest Finger First, a spin-off show to the original UK edition of Who Wants to Be a Millionaire
 Nana Maru San Batsu (Fastest Finger First in English), a Japanese manga series